Kurdish Canadians refers to people of Kurdish origin who are born in or living in Canada.

The Kurdish community in Canada is 16,315 based on the 2016 Canadian Census, among which the Iraqi Kurds make up the largest group of Kurds in Canada, exceeding the numbers of Kurds from Turkey, Iran and Syria.

In Canada, Kurdish immigration was largely the result of the Iran–Iraq War, the Gulf War and Syrian Civil War. Thus, many Iraqi Kurds immigrated to Canada due to the constant wars and suppression of Kurds and Shiites by the Iraqi government. Many Kurds arrived in Canada in the 1980s and the 1990s, most of whom were refugees resettled by the Government of Canada. However, smaller numbers of them also immigrated to Canada in the 1960s and 1970s.

Like all Canadians with origins in West Asia, Kurdish Canadians are legally defined as a visible minority, irrespective of their appearance.

2011 census

2016 census

See also
 Middle Eastern Canadians
 West Asian Canadians
 Kurdish population

References

Kurdish diaspora
Ethnic groups in Canada
 
Kurds
 
West Asian Canadians